The men's welterweight (67 kg/147.4 lbs) Low-Kick division at the W.A.K.O. European Championships 2006 in Skopje was the sixth-lightest of the male Low-Kick tournaments involving fifteen fighters.  Each of the matches was three rounds of two minutes each and was fought under Low-Kick kickboxing rules.

Because there was one too few fighters for a sixteen-man competition, one of the participants had a bye through to the quarter final stage.  The tournament gold medallist was Nikolai Shtakhanov, who defeated fellow Russian Evgeny Grechishkin in the final by unanimous decision.  Semi finalists Venelin Iankov from Bulgaria and France's Mickael Lallemand won bronze medals for their efforts.

Results

Key

See also
List of WAKO Amateur European Championships
List of WAKO Amateur World Championships
List of male kickboxers

References

External links
 WAKO World Association of Kickboxing Organizations Official Site

W.A.K.O. European Championships 2006 (Skopje)